The 2022 mpox outbreak in Asia is a part of the ongoing outbreak of human mpox caused by the West African clade of the monkeypox virus. The outbreak was reported in Asia on 20 May 2022 when Israel reported a suspected case of mpox, which was confirmed on 21 May.  seven West Asian, three Southeast Asian, three East Asian and one South Asian country, along with Russia, have reported confirmed cases.

 a total of 162 cases were confirmed. Most of them were concentrated in the region of West Asia, with 141 of the total 156 cases (≈90.38%) being reported in the region. Israel alone has reported 114 cases (≈73.07%). Israel reported the first community transmission of the disease on 21 June 2022.

Background

Transmission 

A large portion of those infected were believed to have not recently traveled to areas of Africa where mpox is normally found, such as Nigeria, the Democratic Republic of the Congo as well as central and western Africa. It is believed to be transmitted by close contact with sick people, with extra caution for those individuals with lesions on their skin or genitals, along with their bedding and clothing. The CDC has also stated that individuals should avoid contact and consumption of dead animals such as rats, squirrels, monkeys and apes along with wild game or lotions derived from animals in Africa.

In addition to more common symptoms, such as fever, headache, swollen lymph nodes, and rashes or lesions, some patients have also experienced proctitis, an inflammation of the rectum lining. CDC has also warned clinicians to not rule out mpox in patients with sexually transmitted infections since there have been reports of co-infections with syphilis, gonorrhea, chlamydia, and herpes.

History

Imported cases before the outbreak
According to the World Health Organization, imported cases of mpox from Nigeria was detected in Israel and Singapore in September 2018 and May 2019, respectively.

In 2018, an imported case was detected in Israel. A 38-year-old man came from Rivers State, Nigeria in late September. He showed the symptoms of the disease on that month. Later on October the patient sought medical attention at Shaare-Zedek Medical Center in Jerusalem. He was confirmed to be infected with the West African Clade of monkeypox virus that month. All of the patient's contacts were traced and followed up but no virus transmission were detected.

Arrival

As the outbreak was spreading in Europe in the middle of May 2022, the Israeli Health Ministry reported a suspected mpox case in the country on 20 May. The case was confirmed by testing on 21 May, becoming the first case in Israel during the outbreak, which also became the first in Asia.
 
The 30-year-old man returned from Western Europe and contracted the disease from there. The ministry reported that he was in isolation in the Ichilov General Hospital in Tel Aviv.

Cases transited through Asia
In May and June 2022, two Australians tested positive for mpox in Australia, but before that they stayed in transit in airports for some hours in Southeast Asia.

On 30 May, Thai health authorities confirmed that an Australian who stayed in transit in Suvarnabhumi Airport for two hours that week had tested positive for mpox in Australia.

On 6 June, the Singaporean Ministry of Health announced that a mpox case in New South Wales in Australia stayed in transit in Singapore on 2 June. 13 people who had casual contact were isolated.

Wastewater surveillance 
A study from the Faculty of Medicine, Chulalongkorn University, Thailand lead by Dr Dhammika Leshan Wannigama reported  Multiple traces of monkeypox virus were detected in non-sewered wastewater with sparse sampling collected from both the Bangkok, Thailand with increasing concentrations from June to August 2022.  This is the first dataset related to monkeypox viral DNA in wastewater in Bangkok. Monkeypox viral DNA was first detected in wastewater in the second week of June 2022. From the first week of July, the number of viral DNA copies increased. Sanger sequencing confirmed the identification of the monkeypox virus and its relation to the 2022–2023 mpox outbreak.

Timeline of cases by country

Timeline of first confirmed cases by country or territory

Timeline of suspected cases by country or territory 
Countries listed below had only suspected cases at the time of reporting. Some countries reported confirmed cases after reporting suspected cases (i.e. Turkey). Countries listed several times reported suspected cases again after they discarded suspected cases before.

Responses
Several countries have responded to the outbreak. The responses of some of them are listed below.
: On 22 May, the Directorate General of Health Services (DGHS) issued warnings at every port in the country to prevent the spread of mpox. The Directorate spokesperson Nazmul Islam said that the DGHS has asked all air, land and sea ports to be alert. Suspected cases are instructed to be sent to an infectious disease hospital and kept in isolation.

: On 2 June, the Chinese CDC issued a notice quoting the WHO's document with a translation of the original, "Stigmatising people because of a disease is never okay. Anyone can get or pass on moox, regardless of their sexuality."

: On 21 May, Union Health Minister Mansukh Mandaviya directed the National Centre for Disease Control and the ICMR to keep a close watch and monitor the situation. The Union Health Ministry has also directed airport and port health officers to be vigilant, according to official sources. They have been instructed to isolate and send samples to the National Institute of Virology of any sick passenger with a travel history to infected countries.

: Indonesian health authorities were put on alert when cases of mpox were reported in Australia in May 2022. Mohammad Syahril, ministry spokesperson, urged medical personnel and the country's population to be alert and aware of the symptoms of the disease.

: On 27 May 2022, the Malaysian Ministry of Health reactivated the MySejahtera app to provide information and surveillance on mpox.

: Health Secretary Francisco Duque III said that the Philippines was intensifying its border control measures amid the threat of mpox. The health department stated it is exploring potential sources of mpox vaccines and antivirals.

: On May 21, the Saudi Ministry of Health stated that they are ready to monitor and investigate cases of mpox, if any occurs. They added that it also has an integrated preventive plan to deal with such cases if they appear, including identifying suspected and confirmed cases.

: On 30 May, the Taiwan Centers for Disease Control officially listed mpox as a notifiable infectious disease, and on June 23, mpox was officially upgraded to a second-class notifiable infectious disease, which means that confirmed cases must be notified within 24 hours, and if necessary, isolation treatment may be implemented in designated isolation treatment institutions.

: On 24 May 2022, the Department of Disease Control (DDC) started screening all overseas passengers from Central African countries and other outbreak countries at international airports. On 26 May 2022, the DDC set up an emergency operations center to monitor the outbreak situation and plan for a possible outbreak in the kingdom. Anutin Charnvirakul, Minister of Public Health, said that the government is seeking a smallpox vaccine from the WHO to bolster the public's immunity in case of a viral outbreak. On 30 May 2022, The local news reported the first case of mpox in the country. The patient was a passenger who was transiting from Europe to Australia via Bangkok. However, the patient's symptoms developed and were diagnosed in Australia. There have been no local cases discovered as of yet.

: On May 24, 2022, Vietnam's Ministry of Health asked border localities to increase surveillance to detect possible cases of mpox.

Outbreak by regions and countries

Western Asia

Georgia
Georgia was the first Caucasian and the third Asian and West Asian country to report confirmed cases of mpox. The first case was reported by the Ministry of Health on 15 June 2022.

Israel

Israel was the first in both Asia and West Asia to report a case.

On 20 May, Israel reported a suspected mpox infected patient who was in isolation in Ichilov Hospital and tested positive on 21 May. On the same day, another suspected case was reported but the case was ruled out the next day, on 22 May.

Israel reported a single case each on 28 May and 7, 9, 15 and 16 June until the authorities reported three cases on 20 June. In a press statement released on 21 June, the ministry stated that one of them was infected locally, confirming community transmission of the disease in Israel. The total reached 9 on that day.

The case figure was updated regularly and press releases were released on the ministry's website whenever cases where reported. But after 21 June, the ministry started to release weekly report of the situation on the website.

On 15 July, Health Minister Nitzan Horowitz announced that 2,000 mpox vaccines will arrive in Israel, adding that he spoke with biotech company Bavarian Nordic CEO Paul Chaplin. He also said that a total of 90 cases were registered till then, and none of them needed hospitalisation.

As of 17 July 2022, 96 confirmed cases were reported in Israel.

Lebanon
On 20 June, the first case of mpox in Lebanon was reported by the National News Agency (NNA) stating the Ministry of Health, thus Lebanon became the fourth country in both Asia and West Asia and the third in the Middle East to report a mpox case.

Saudi Arabia
On 14 July, the first mpox case was detected in the capital city of Riyadh. The person came from abroad.

Turkey

United Arab Emirates

South Asia

Afghanistan

On 29 May, the Islamic Republic News Agency and other news agencies reported two suspected cases of mpox who came back from Iran in Nimruz Province citing local newspapers and the Ministry of Health and provincial health authorities.

On 30 May, one case was reported in Herat Province.

On 31 May, ministry spokesperson Javid Hazhir denied reports of confirmed cases and stated that suspected cases in Nimruz and Kabul provinces tested negative. He also said that Afghanistan has the capability to test mpox cases.

On 5 June, it was reported that the WHO will give test kits to the Taliban-controlled Ministry of Public Health, as they were lacking kits. Ministry spokesperson stated that suspected cases in Herat, Maidan Wardak and Nangarhar provinces along with other provinces which were stated earlier tested negative and the country is free of mpox.

Bangladesh
Bangladeshi health authorities declared alert on every ports in the country in mid-May. Shahjalal International Airport in Dhaka was in high alert.

On 7 June, a 32-year-old Turkish citizen was detected with mpox symptoms at the airport while screening. He was taken to the Infectious Diseases Hospital in Dhaka's Mohakhali and isolated. Although, on the same day the Ministry of Health and Family Welfare published a press release denying reports of mpox 'confirmed' in a foreigner.

On the next day, the DGHS director stated that he investigated the Turkish citizen himself, and his symptoms were not due to mpox, and he was suffering from a skin disease for a long time.

On 9 June, the suspected case tested negative.

On 10 June, a 60-year-old woman was isolated in Chuadanga after local doctors detected symptoms of mpox on her on 9 June. On the same day, a 42-year-old man who came back from India through Benapole Border Crossing on 3 June, was sent to Jashore Hospital after he showed pox like symptoms. Although, the district civil surgeon said on the next day that he was very probably infected with chickenpox.

On 12 June, the case in Chuandanga was discarded.

Bangladesh was the first country bar shore passes. On late May, Chittagong Seaport authority barred shore passes for all crew unless in the case of an emergency, while signed-off crew will have to undergo health checks.

India

On 21 May, Union Health Minister Mansukh Mandaviya directed the National Centre for Disease Control and the ICMR to keep a close watch and monitor the situation and directed airport and port health officers to be vigilant. They have been instructed to isolate and send samples to the National Institute of Virology (NIV) of any sick passenger with a travel history to infected countries.

Many other states also responded individually, including Karnataka, Kerala, Madhya Pradesh, Maharashtra,  Rajasthan, Tamil Nadu, Uttar Pradesh, and West Bengal.

On 3 June, a sample of a 5-year-old girl of Ghaziabad in Uttar Pradesh who showed some symptoms of mpox were sent to the National Institute of Virology in Pune. The test came back negative on 7 June.

On 14 July, the health minister of Kerala Veena George announced a suspected case in Kerala. The patient was a male who came back from the United Arab Emirates three days earlier. The patient reportedly died on 31 July, making it the first mpox casualty in India.

Southeast Asia

Philippines

Singapore
On 21 June 2022, Singaporean officials reported that a British flight attendant in the country had tested positive for the virus on 20 June. Singapore was the fifth Asian and first Southeast Asian country to report an mpox case during this outbreak.

On 6 July, Singaporean authorities confirmed the first case of local transmission.
One more imported case was reported each on 7 and 8 July 2022, of which both are conveyed to the National Centre for Infectious Diseases (NCID). 

On 13 July, the Ministry of Health reported another locally transmitted case, taking the total tally to 5. The patient was a 48-year-old British national residing in Singapore and was also warded in the NCID.

Another local case was reported on the next day on 14 July. The patient was a male in his 40s, and was also warded in the NCID.

Thailand
On 21 July 2022, the Thai health ministry reported the first case of mpox in the country. The patient was a 21 year-old Nigerian who stayed in Phuket before crossing the border into Cambodia and subsequently arrested in Phnom Penh. A week later, a second confirmed case was found in Bangkok in a 47 year-old local man who admitted to had engaged in sexual contact with foreign men.

On 3 August, a third confirmed case was reported by the Department of Disease Control. The patient was a 25 year-old German man who arrived in Phuket on July 18 as a tourist. On 5 August, the first confirmed case of a female in the country was announced. The patient was a 22 year-old Thai woman who frequented Bangkok night spots. On 15 August, it was reported that the fifth confirmed mpox patient in the country was a 25 year-old Thai woman returning from Dubai. A study from the Faculty of Medicine, Chulalongkorn University, Thailand lead by Dr Dhammika Leshan Wannigama reported  Multiple traces of monkeypox virus were detected in non-sewered wastewater in Thailand with increasing concentrations from June to August 2022.

East Asia

China
On 16 September, China reported its first case of mpox in Chongqing municipality.

Japan
On 25 July, Japan reported its first case of mpox in a man in his 30s. On 28 July, a second case was reported from a man in his 30s. On 5 August, a third case was reported. On 10 August, a fourth case was reported.

South Korea
On 22 June, South Korea reported its first mpox case.

Taiwan

In May 2022, the Taiwan Centers for Disease Control started increasing monitoring for mpox cases. Later that month, health minister Chen Shih-chung stated that Taiwan was not yet planning to purchase a mpox vaccine. 

As the global outbreak spread, Taiwan designated mpox as a category 2 communicable disease on 23 June. On 24 June, Taiwan reported its first confirmed case of mpox in a 25 year-old Taiwanese man who came back to Taiwan on 16 June after studying in Germany. He started showing symptoms on 20 June and tested positive for mpox after seeking medical attention. Two days after the index case was publicized, the CDC issued guidelines for risk assessment and control. By 27 June, the CDC had begun working to reverse the vaccine policy declared in May, stating that talks to acquire mpox medications and vaccines had started. Later on 30 June, the CDC issued a travel warning for 44 countries that had reported cases of mpox. On 2 July, the CDC announced that they are planning to receive third-generation smallpox vaccines and antiviral drugs in late 2022. The CDC said that frontline medical workers and researchers will be the first to receive the vaccine. On 12 July, Taiwan reported its second case, in a Taiwanese man in his 30s who returned to Taiwan from the United States. On 24 July, the CDC announced that they signed a contract to purchase medication to treat mpox patients, and that a shipment will arrive in August at the earliest. The CDC also announced that they are in talks to purchase mpox vaccines, and that they are hoping to receive them by late August. On 27 July, 504 courses of mpox medications arrived in Taiwan, to be used by severe cases and immunocompromised individuals.

North Asia (Russia) 
The first mpox case in Russia, and by extension North Asia, was confirmed on 12 July 2022, in a young man who returned from a trip to Europe.

Statistics

Overview

This is a table of confirmed and suspected mpox cases in Asian countries during the ongoing 2022–2023 mpox outbreak. It does not include countries where suspected cases were reported but later discarded such as Afghanistan.

Graphs
(These graphs excludes the cases reported in Russia)

Total cases of mpox in Asia

Total confirmed cases by Asian countries

New confirmed cases of mpox per day

7-day-average of new cases

Total confirmed cases by day

New confirmed cases of mpox per week
(A week is considered Saturday to Friday here)

Total confirmed cases of mpox by week
(A week is considered Saturday to Friday here)

Daily cases by subregions

Total cases by subregions

See also
2022–2023 mpox outbreak
Timeline of the 2022–2023 mpox outbreak
Mpox in Nigeria
Mpox in the Democratic Republic of the Congo
2022–2023 mpox outbreak in Europe
 2022–2023 mpox outbreak in France
 2022–2023 mpox outbreak in Germany
 2022–2023 mpox outbreak in the Netherlands
 2022–2023 mpox outbreak in Portugal
 2022–2023 mpox outbreak in Spain
 2022–2023 mpox outbreak in the United Kingdom
2022–2023 mpox outbreak in Canada
2022–2023 mpox outbreak in Peru
2022–2023 mpox outbreak in South Africa
2022–2023 mpox outbreak in the United States

Notes

References

External links

Asia
Mpox